Parliamentary elections were held in Egypt in January 1945. Boycotted by the Wafd Party, they resulted in a victory for the Saadist Institutional Party, which won 125 of the 264 seats.

Results

References

Egypt
Elections in Egypt
1945 in Egypt
January 1945 events in Africa
Election and referendum articles with incomplete results